= Reinfeld-Hammer =

Place in Pomerania, Prussian from 1928 to 1945

Reinfeld-Hammer was a rural municipality in the Prussian province of Pomerania, existing from 1928 to 1945.

The municipality was formed in 1928: As part of the dissolution of the estate districts in Prussia, the rural municipality of Reinfeld R, the estate district of Reinfeld R and the estate district of Hammer were combined to form a new rural municipality, which was given the name "Reinfeld-Hammer". In the municipality of Reinfeld-Hammer 563 inhabitants were counted in 1933, in 1939 568 inhabitants.

Until 1945, the municipality of Reinfeld-Hammer belonged to the district of Rummelsburg in the Prussian province of Pomerania. In the municipality were officially the residential places Alt Fließhof, Bahnhof Reinfeld (Pom.), Eichhof, Gut Charlottenhof, Haferkamp, Hammer, Lindenhof and Reinfeld b. Rummelsburg i. Pom. were listed.

In 1945 the community of Reinfeld-Hammer, like all of Hinterpommern, came to Poland. The inhabitants were expelled. Today, illages ng to the Gmina Miastko (Rummelsburg commune) in the Powiat Bytowski (Bütow district).
